Carlos Felipe Herrera Contreras (born 6 August 1983) is a Chilean footballer. 

He was born in Graneros, Chile, and played for Ñublense.

Honours

Player
Cobresal
 Primera División de Chile (1): 2015 Clausura

Notes

References

 
 

1983 births
Living people
Chilean footballers
Club Deportivo Palestino footballers
O'Higgins F.C. footballers
Chilean Primera División players
Primera B de Chile players
Association football defenders